Shadow of the Tomb Raider is a 2018 action-adventure video game developed by Eidos-Montréal and published by Square Enix's European subsidiary. It continues the narrative from the 2015 game Rise of the Tomb Raider and is the twelfth mainline entry in the Tomb Raider series, as well as the third and final entry of the Survivor trilogy. The game was originally released worldwide for PlayStation 4, Windows, and Xbox One. Versions for Linux and macOS, and Stadia, were released in November 2019. After release, the game was expanded upon with downloadable content in both a season pass and as standalone releases.

Set roughly a year after the events of Rise of the Tomb Raider, its story follows Lara Croft as she ventures through the tropical regions of the Americas to the legendary city Paititi, battling the paramilitary organization Trinity and racing to stop a Mayan apocalypse she has unleashed. Lara must traverse the environment and combat enemies with firearms and stealth as she explores semi-open hubs. In these hubs she can raid challenge tombs to unlock new rewards, complete side missions, and scavenge for resources which can be used to craft useful materials.

Development began in 2015 following the completion of Rise of the Tomb Raider, lasting until July 2018. Shadow of the Tomb Raider was designed to conclude Lara's journey begun in the 2013 reboot, with a key theme being descent both through the jungle environment and into her personality. The setting and narrative was based on Mayan and Aztec mythologies, with the team consulting historians to create the architecture and people of Paititi. The gameplay was adjusted based on both fan feedback and the wishes of Eidos Montréal, incorporating swimming and grappling while increasing difficulty tailoring. Camilla Luddington returned to provide voice and motion-capture work for Lara. The game cost an estimated US$110–135 million to develop, making it one of the most expensive games ever made.

Released as the final installment in Lara Croft's origin trilogy, Shadow of the Tomb Raider received generally positive reviews from critics, with particular praise going to the game's emphasis on challenge tombs and puzzles, although some felt that the series' gameplay had become stale and lacked innovation. While opening to slow sales, the game eventually shipped over 8.9 million copies worldwide.

Gameplay
 

Shadow of the Tomb Raider is an action-adventure game played from a third-person perspective; players take on the role of Lara Croft as she explores environments across Mexico and Peru. In addition to standalone areas, the game has a large hub in the hidden city of Paititi. A new barter system allows players to trade and sell various resources gathered from the areas surrounding Paititi.

There are numerous adjustments made to gameplay, which is otherwise identical to Rise of the Tomb Raider. The controls for swimming have been revised, as Lara is able to hold her breath underwater for a longer period of time due to the introduction of air pockets. She has the ability to rappel down a cliff using her climbing axe and rope. Stealth is important, as Lara can disengage from combat when she escapes from enemies' line of sight by camouflaging  herself in mud, hiding in bushes or blending into densely vegetated surfaces.

Like its predecessors, the game allows players to hunt wild animals, craft materials using resources collected, solve puzzles and seek out optional tombs and side quests. The game features larger tombs and more complex puzzles compared to previous installments in the reboot series. Players have the option to tailor their gameplay experience as exploration, puzzles and combat have their own difficulty settings. An Immersion Mode enables players to hear the background conversations of the locals in their native languages; when turned off the conversations are heard in the players' chosen voice over language.

Plot
In 2015, months since the events of Rise of the Tomb Raider, Lara Croft (Camilla Luddington) and her friend Jonah Maiava (Earl Baylon) have dedicated themselves to stopping the activities of paramilitary organization Trinity. The two track a cell to Cozumel in Mexico, led by Pedro Dominguez (Carlos Leal), the head of Trinity's High Council. At Trinity's excavation site, Lara discovers a temple containing the Dagger of Chak Chel and references to a hidden city. Murals adorning the walls allude to the Silver Box of Ix Chel and warn of "the Cleansing", a Mayan apocalypse culminating in a permanent solar eclipse. Lara ignores the warnings and takes the Dagger to prevent Trinity from acquiring it. Dominguez catches her and reveals that by taking the Dagger, Lara has triggered the Cleansing. He takes the Dagger, intending to unite it with the Box to stop the Cleansing and use the power it grants him to remake the world in his image. Lara and Jonah escape a tsunami that destroys Cozumel and foreshadows the coming apocalypse.

Despite growing tensions between them over her actions, Lara and Jonah pursue Dominguez into the Amazon. Their plane crashes in the Peruvian jungle during the second cataclysm—a massive storm—and the two find their way to Paititi, the hidden city shown in the murals. Exploring local tombs reveals that piercing the Box with the Dagger will grant the user the power of the god Kukulkan, which must be used to halt the Cleansing. When Lara saves a boy named Etzli (Kamran Lucas), she and Jonah are brought into Paititi by his mother Unuratu (Patricia Velásquez), queen of the city. Dominguez is revealed to be the leader of a cult dedicated to Kukulkan and Unuratu's brother-in-law Amaru, who was taken by Trinity as a child. Unuratu directs Lara to the Box, but Lara finds it is missing. Believing the cult already has the Box, Lara and Unuratu attempt to steal it, but Unuratu is captured. Lara also encounters strange humanoid monsters identified as the Yaaxil, guardians of the Box, and their leader Crimson Fire.

Lara learns that the Box was taken centuries ago by Andres Lopez, a missionary sent by Trinity during the Spanish conquest of South America. She rescues Unuratu and realizes that Amaru does not fully understand the ritual; rather than merely imbuing Kukulkan's power, the ritual sacrifices it to stop the Cleansing. Unuratu is shot by Commander Rourke, Amaru's second in command. Before she dies, Unuratu implores Lara to complete the ritual but warns her not to let the Box influence her. Rourke attacks Lara and Jonah, who are separated as they leave Paititi. The two reunite at an oil refinery and decipher the Box's location, a nearby Christian mission established by Lopez.

Lara and Jonah find a secret catacomb beneath the mission leading to Lopez's tomb and the Box. Amaru intercepts them and forces Lara to surrender the Box. He admits that he ordered her father's death to prevent him from finding Paititi and revealing it to the world. Lara tries to persuade Amaru to use the ritual to benefit the world. He refuses, as the Cleansing will only affect Paititi. He leaves Lara and Jonah to escape the third cataclysm, a massive earthquake that causes a landslide.

Back in Paititi, Lara and Jonah help the newly-crowned Etzli lead an assault on an underground temple complex. They plan to disrupt Amaru's ceremony while avoiding the fourth cataclysm, a volcanic eruption. Lara is forced to go on alone. She encounters the Yaaxil and Crimson Fire, convincing them to help her stop Amaru. Rourke and the Trinity High Council are slaughtered by the Yaaxil while Lara makes her way to the temple summit. Amaru starts the ritual and absorbs Kukulkan's power as the solar eclipse begins. After a lengthy battle, Lara overpowers Amaru and fatally stabs him. Accepting defeat, Amaru transfers Kukulkan's power to Lara as he dies. True to Unuratu's warning, she is tempted to use the Box to revive her parents, but instead lets Crimson Fire symbolically stab her, sacrificing Kukulkan's spirit and stopping the Cleansing.

In the aftermath, Unuratu is laid to rest, and Jonah decides to take a vacation. Lara stays in Paititi to help Etzli restore the city to its former glory. A post-credits scene shows Lara planning her next adventure at Croft Manor, acknowledging that her role is not to solve the world's mysteries, but to protect them.

Downloadable content
Shadow of the Tomb Raider released several chapters of downloadable content that expanded on the game's narrative. Each of these chapters run parallel to the main storyline and focus on an additional tomb. Lara uncovers the source of Mayan influence in Peru and solves the mystery of a missing oil worker; locates an artefact to bolster Unuratu's rebellion, but finds a secret that could threaten it; confronts her worst fears as she searches for a potent weapon; learns of a tragedy that shaped Amaru's decision to join Trinity; aids a splinter group of rebels taken by the Cult of Kukulkan; investigates a disturbance at a local temple that turns into a trap laid by Trinity; and learns the fate of the Yaaxil that survived the battle with Trinity.

Development
Development of Shadow of the Tomb Raider began in 2015, shortly after the release of Rise of the Tomb Raider. Unlike previous entries in the Tomb Raider reboot series which were primarily developed by Crystal Dynamics, Eidos-Montréal assumed major development duties for Shadow of the Tomb Raider while Crystal Dynamics provided additional development. While the studio had acted in a support role on the previous entries in the rebooted Tomb Raider series, this time Crystal Dynamics transferred into a support role. Due to this transition, the staff at both Eidos-Montréal and Crystal Dynamics needed to adjust, with the Eidos Montréal undergoing "growing pains" while moving from a supporting to a leading development role. Similar to their work on the Deus Ex series and Thief, Eidos-Montréal first gained a deep understanding of the series' basic elements, then set about building the game using both previous entries and their own design philosophies.

Shadow of the Tomb Raider was built using the Foundation engine initially built by Crystal Dynamics. This is the same engine used to build Rise of the Tomb Raider, but was enhanced by Eidos Montreal.

Eidos-Montréal estimated the game's development costs as between $75 and $100 million, with a separate marketing and promotion budget of $35 million, becoming the studio's largest project at the time. Studio head David Anfossi admitted the scale of the project in the modern gaming market and the need to make a profit. With the costs in mind, Eidos-Montréal sought to incorporate experimental elements within multiplayer options to give the game longevity using the emerging "games as a service" trend so the game could provide post-release income and foster a large community. Development was completed on 24 July 2018, with Eidos-Montréal confirming that the game was declared gold (indicating that it was being prepared for duplication and release).

Plot and gameplay

Shadow of the Tomb Raider was designed to evolve the narrative and gameplay elements of Lara Croft; in the 2013 reboot she was portrayed as a hunted survivor, Rise of the Tomb Raider revealed her beginning to pursue her own goals, and Shadow of the Tomb Raider was designed to show her mastering the environment. The story closes off the rebooted origin story, with Lara becoming "the tomb raider she was always meant to be". Narrative director Jason Dozois defined this as being Lara's ultimate "tomb raider" persona within the reboot timeline rather than a return to the character of Lara from games prior to 2013:

The staff wanted to tackle the "political tension" and social impact of a rich white woman hunting artefacts in foreign lands, with Lara coming to terms with her position in the story's climax. The setting of Latin America was chosen to reflect this theme. Lara's obsession and darker personality traits played into this, with several scenes emphasizing the sacrifices she was forced to make during her pursuit of Trinity. The destruction Lara releases when claiming a key artefact before Trinity was designed as an inversion of the traditional Tomb Raider approach, which used a similar style without consequences. Several different post-credit scenes were considered for the game. When first released, one of the scrapped scenes was included by mistake, with a post-release patch replacing it with the intended cutscene.

British-American actress Camilla Luddington reprised her role from the previous two games, and was able to help Eidos-Montréal keep Lara's characterization consistent with the previous games. As with Tomb Raider and Rise of the Tomb Raider, Luddington provided Lara's motion capture, calling Shadow of the Tomb Raider one of the most difficult emotional performances from her time playing Lara. The main antagonist was intended as Lara's emotional foe, with the jungle being her physical foe. Lara's relationship with Jonah evolved further; while in Tomb Raider they had been distant, in Rise he protected her out of loyalty to their lost friends, while in Shadow they share a strong bond which prompts Jonah to support her. Due to their previous experience with cinematic storytelling, Eidos Montréal designed the narrative of Shadow of the Tomb Raider to have more cinematic moments. The team needed to consider the overall concept of the reboot trilogy, and narrative threads previously left unresolved in Rise including who killed Lara's father. Before recording began, the cast read through the script so the performances could be more convincing.

The game's jungle setting was chosen to "complete" Lara's abilities, carrying over old skills while learning new ones to face new threats. It acted as a visual contrast to the previous games. While the team were restricted in story design by the overall plan, they were able to adjust the gameplay balance to bring a greater focus on puzzles compared to Rise. The aim was to have Lara undergo an evolution when faced with the jungle's harsh reality, with her early confrontation with jaguars being the catalyst which starts her transformation. The stealth elements—including camouflaging and the use of fear tactics—drew inspiration from films such as Rambo and Predator. Swimming was incorporated into the gameplay, though the team gave it a "survival-action" feel.

Director Daniel Chayer-Bisson described redesigning the established level design as "a nightmare", because they had to take into account player experimentation and potential sequence breaking when implementing new mechanics such as climbing onto overhangs and using the grappling line. During surveys of the fan base, the team heard wishes both for harder puzzles and the removal of visual climbing aids such as white surfaces. As removing them outright would have made the game intimidating for newcomers, they created the scaling difficulty settings as a compromise. Shadow of the Tomb Raider was made inviting for newcomers as the opening section acted as both a narrative introduction and a tutorial for Lara's abilities. The overall verticality of environments and its impact on mechanics such as swimming and grappling reflected the game's theme of "descent".

Art and music design
The setting and narrative took inspiration from Mayan, Aztec and Incan mythology, including its recurring focus on sun worship, sacrifice, and the ages of mankind. The Mayan influence was chosen due to that culture's fixation on astronomy and dates. During the initial design pitch, the designers wanted Lara to discover a real lost tomb with people living around it, a concept previously limited by the technology available at the time. During their research, they chose the city of Paititi due to its historic precedent over purely fictional locations such as El Dorado. The culture of Paititi was based on the supposition that elements Aztec and Maya of Mesoamerican cultures could have migrated into Peru. The culture and people of Paititi were based on historic accounts of the Maya, Aztec and Inca peoples. The clothing of the people were based on historic examples and accounts. The team consulted historians to ensure their cultural depictions were accurate and respectful.

The music for Shadow of the Tomb Raider was composed by Brian D'Oliveira. While following the musical styles established since the 2013 reboot, the team added new esthetic elements, incorporating the local culture and the darker portrayal of both Lara and her mission. D'Oliveira was brought on due to his ability with South American instruments, and during recording at his Montreal studios worked with native musicians to achieve the right sound for each location. Martin Stig Andersen worked as Ambient Sound Designer, who focused on the sound transition for underwater segments. The team brought back "The Instrument", a specially-designed percussion instrument created for the 2013 reboot's soundtrack by Matt McConnell. "The Instrument" was used to help convey the primal aspects of Lara's character, in addition to referencing her adventure on Yamatai in the 2013 game.

Release
Square Enix confirmed that a sequel to Rise of the Tomb Raider was in development and scheduled to be released on 14 September 2018 for PlayStation 4, Windows, and Xbox One. The Windows version was developed by Nixxes Software, who had worked on several earlier Tomb Raider games for the platform. The game was ported to Linux and macOS by Feral Interactive on 5 November 2019. It was released for Stadia on 19 November as part of the platform's launch line-up alongside the 2013 reboot and Rise of the Tomb Raider.

The PC and Stadia ports were created by Nixxes Software. A season pass gives players access to seven "paths" of downloadable content (DLC) which include new narratives, missions, tombs, weapons, outfits and skills. None of these would contain additional story content, which was complete with the base release. A version bundling together the main game and DLC, Shadow of the Tomb Raider: Definitive Edition, was also released on November 4. The Feral Interactive ports and Stadia version were based on this release.

Reception

Critical response

Shadow of the Tomb Raider received "generally-favorable" reviews, according to video game review aggregator Metacritic.

Brett Makedonski of Destructoid compared the game's themes to Uncharted and Indiana Jones and the Temple of Doom, praised the graphics, platforming and tomb challenges, but criticized the story narrative. He is glad that the game rather avoids what the series is weak at (fighting). Similarly, Caty McCarthy of USGamer enjoyed tombs, swimming and stealth, but disliked fighting. Electronic Gaming Monthly gave a positive review, and said that the game managed to separate itself from other similar titles through the refined state of its mechanics and design. Rachel Weber from GamesRadar also praised the game, calling it "the strongest entry in the rebooted trilogy" and saying that Shadow of the Tomb Raider stayed true to the character's strengths, and praised the implementation of challenge tombs.

Lucy O'Brien of IGN said Shadow of the Tomb Raider offered a fitting conclusion to Lara Croft's origin trilogy, stating that the game's story manages to make a satisfying line between high-concept fun and grounded character exploration. Michael Leri of Game Revolution praised the game's numerous challenge tombs and puzzles, praising the tombs as fun and challenging, and lauding the puzzles as the game's best feature. Andy Kelly from PC Gamer (US) called it one of the best Tomb Raider games to date, pointing out its improved stealth combat and tomb exploration.

Chris Plante of Polygon praised the character and gameplay progression throughout the trilogy, calling Shadow of the Tomb Raider "a refinement rather than revision" of the first two reboot titles, adding that the game was to be praised as it was the best version of the mechanics demonstrated in the previous two entries. Conversely, VideoGamers Josh Wise disliked the main storyline as being filled with padding and undermined by weak writing, though he praised the platforming and world design. Edmond Tran of GameSpot also gave a mixed review, criticizing the game's side quests and Lara's character development while praising the story missions, graphics, environments and explorable tombs.

Sales
Upon release, Shadow of the Tomb Raider got off to a slow start in sales, attributed by Square Enix president Yosuke Matsuda to a lack of originality compared to other titles at the time. The game was the fifth best-selling title in the US. By the end of December 2018, the game shipped 4.12 million copies worldwide. While it saw lower sales than many other titles of that year, Eidos-Montréal was very happy with its sales as well as its critical reception, prompting them to produce the DLC episodes. As of December 2021, the game has sold 8.9 million copies.

Accolades

Animated sequel 
In a joint co-production between Netflix and Legendary Entertainment, an anime-style series adaptation based on the video game reboot franchise was in the works, and that the series will be primarily set after the events of Shadow of the Tomb Raider.

Notes

References

External links 
 

2018 video games
Action-adventure games
Apocalyptic video games
Crystal Dynamics games
Eidos-Montréal games
Feral Interactive games
Linux games
MacOS games
PlayStation 4 games
PlayStation 4 Pro enhanced games
Square Enix games
Stadia games
Stealth video games
Survival video games
Tomb Raider games
Universal Windows Platform apps
Video games about cults
Video games based on Native American mythology
Video game sequels
Video games developed in Canada
Video games developed in the Netherlands
Video games developed in the United States
Video games featuring female protagonists
Video games set in England
Video games set in forests
Video games set in Mexico
Video games set in Peru
Video games with downloadable content
Windows games
Xbox One games
Xbox One X enhanced games
Video games developed in the United Kingdom
Single-player video games
Nixxes Software games